Stein Morten Lier (born 3 June 1967) is a Norwegian crime novelist.

He is a son of police chief Leif A. Lier. Documentaric and semi-documentaric books include En reisende i drap (2002), Illusjonen som brast (2006) and Rikets tilstand (2007). Crime fiction releases include Catch (2004), Mafiya (2005), Bizniz (2006) and Øye for øye (2008).

References

1967 births
Living people
Norwegian crime fiction writers